Walt Ader (December 15, 1913 in Long Valley, New Jersey – November 25, 1982 in Califon, New Jersey) was an American racecar driver.

During his racing career, Ader was a resident of Bernardsville, New Jersey.

AAA results
(key) (Races in bold indicate pole position)

Indy 500 results

Complete Formula One World Championship results
(key)

References

1913 births
1982 deaths
People from Bernardsville, New Jersey
People from Washington Township, Morris County, New Jersey
Racing drivers from New Jersey
Indianapolis 500 drivers
AAA Championship Car drivers
Sportspeople from Somerset County, New Jersey